The Catch may refer to:

Film and television
The Catch (2023 TV series), 2023 British family drama television series
The Catch (TV series), 2016-2017 American mystery television series
The Catch (1961 film), 1961 film by Nagisa Oshima
The Catch (1983 film), 1983 Japanese film by Shinji Sōmai

Music
The Catch (American band), a rock band from Seattle, Washington
The Catch (British duo), a new wave duo
The Catch (album), a 1984 album by Nazareth
The Catch, a band featuring Annie Lennox and Dave Stewart before they formed the Tourists

Sport 
The Catch (baseball), a defensive play by Willie Mays in the 1954 World Series
The Catch (college football), a winning touchdown catch by Clemson in 1977 against South Carolina
The Catch (American football), a winning touchdown reception by Dwight Clark in the 1981 NFC Championship
The Catch, a defensive play by Endy Chávez in the 2006 National League Championship Series
The Catch, a catch by Alabama receiver Tyrone Prothro that won 2006 ESPY Best Play of the Year
The Catch, Tony Gabriel's winning touchdown catch in the Canadian Football League's 64th Grey Cup
The Catch, a defensive play by Chas McCormick in the 2022 World Series

Other uses 
The Catch (short story), a story in Nadine Gordimer's 1957 collection The Soft Voice of the Serpent
"The Catch", an installation artwork by Thom Ross as a recreation of Willie Mays' famous catch
The Catch, 2020 novel written by T.M.Logan, on which The Catch (2023 TV series) was based.

See also 
Catch (disambiguation)
The Helmet Catch, an Eli Manning pass to David Tyree in Super Bowl XLII